Ramon H. Lopez (born February 1983) in San Jose, Nueva Ecija, is a Filipino painter and artist known for using rust as medium for his painting.

Career 
He used indigenous materials such as rust as his medium. He started to collect rusting objects from trash, carefully segregating the rust particles which he uses for his art works. He decided to become a rust painter and plans to create more artistic works in the future. He is assured that his works will pass the test of times since he puts top coats in all his works.

References 

Living people
1983 births
University of the Philippines people
21st-century Filipino painters
People from Nueva Ecija